Songs of the Plains is the second studio album by Canadian singer-songwriter Colter Wall. It was released on October 12, 2018 under Thirty Tigers.

Commercial performance
Songs of the Plains has sold 18,800 copies in the United States as of March 2020.

Critical reception
Songs of the Plains was met with "generally favorable" reviews from critics. At Metacritic, which assigns a weighted average rating out of 100 to reviews from mainstream publications, this release received an average score of 79, based on 8 reviews. Aggregator Album of the Year gave the release a 78 out of 100 based on a critical consensus of 7 reviews.

Stephen Thomas Erlewine of AllMusic said: "Throughout Songs of the Plains, Wall relies on stories and sketches designed to conjure ghosts of the Canadian prairies he calls home. As alluring as his spooky, skeletal arrangements are -- steel guitars are used as howling accents, not solos; he occasionally gooses his band to follow a train track rhythm".

Accolades

Track listing

Personnel

Musicians
 Colter Wall – guitar, vocals
 Billy Don Burns – featured artist
 Wilf Carter – featured artist
 Dave Cobb – guitar, producer
 Corb Lund – vocals
 Blake Berglund - vocals
 Chris Powell – drums
 Mickey Raphael – harmonica
 Jason Simpson – bass

Production
 Gena Johnson – engineer

Charts

References

2018 albums
Colter Wall albums
Thirty Tigers albums